Francisco Buarque de Hollanda (born 19 June 1944), popularly known simply as Chico Buarque, is a Brazilian singer-songwriter, guitarist, composer, playwright, writer, and poet. He is best known for his music, which often includes social, economic, and cultural reflections on Brazil.

The firstborn son of Sérgio Buarque de Hollanda, Buarque lived at several locations throughout his childhood, though mostly in Rio de Janeiro, São Paulo, and Rome. He wrote and studied literature as a child and found music through the bossa nova compositions of Tom Jobim and João Gilberto. He performed as a singer and guitarist in the 1960s as well as writing a play that was deemed dangerous by the Brazilian military dictatorship of the time. Buarque, along with several Tropicalist and MPB musicians, was threatened by the Brazilian military government and eventually left Brazil for Italy in 1969. However, he came back to Brazil in 1970, and continued to record, perform, and write, though much of his material was suppressed by government censors. He released several more albums in the 1980s and published three novels in the 1990s and 2000s.

In 2019, Buarque was awarded the Camões Prize, the most important prize for literature in the Portuguese language.

Early life and career 

Buarque was born in Rio de Janeiro on 19 June 1944. He came from an intellectually privileged family background—his father Sérgio Buarque de Holanda was a well-known historian, sociologist and journalist and his mother Maria Amélia Cesário Alvim was a painter and pianist. He is also brother of the singer Miúcha and politician Ana de Hollanda. As a child, he was impressed by the musical style of bossa nova, specifically the work of Tom Jobim and João Gilberto. He was also interested in writing, composing his first short story at 18 years old and studying European literature, also at a young age. One of his most consuming interests, however, was playing football, beginning at age four, and he still played regularly in his 60s. During his childhood, he lived in Rio de Janeiro, São Paulo and Rome.

Before becoming a musician, Buarque decided at one point to study architecture at the University of São Paulo, but this choice did not lead to a career in that field; Buarque often skipped classes.

He made his public debut as musician and composer in 1964, rapidly building his reputation at music festivals and television variety shows when bossa nova came to light and Nara Leão recorded three of his songs. His eponymous debut album exemplified his future work, with catchy sambas characterized by inventive wordplay and an undercurrent of nostalgic tragedy. Buarque had his first hit with "A Banda" in 1966, written about a marching band, and soon released several more singles. Although playing bossa nova, during his career, samba and Música popular brasileira would also be widely explored. Despite that, Buarque was criticized by two of the leading musicians at the time, Caetano Veloso and Gilberto Gil as they believed his musical style was overly conservative. However, an existentially themed play that Buarque wrote and composed in 1968, Roda Viva ("Live Circle"), was frowned upon by the military government and Buarque served a short prison sentence because of it. He left Brazil for Italy for 18 months in 1970, returning to write his first novel in 1972, which was not targeted by censors.

At this time his thinly veiled protest single "Apesar de Você" ("In spite of You" – in reference to the military dictatorship) was also produced. "Apesar de Você" was overlooked by the military censors, becoming an important anthem in the democratic movement. After selling over 100,000 copies, the single was eventually censored and removed from the market. At one point in 1974, the censors banned any song authored by Chico Buarque. Then, he created a pseudonym, naming himself "Julinho da Adelaide", complete with life history and interviews to newspapers. "Julinho da Adelaide" authored songs such as "Jorge Maravilha" and "Acorda amor" before he was outed in a Jornal do Brasil news story. Buarque also wrote a play named Calabar, about the Dutch invasion of Brazil in the seventeenth century, drawing parallels with the military regime. Despite the censorship, songs such as "Samba de Orly" (1970), "Acorda amor" (1974, as "Julinho da Adelaide") manifested Buarque's continuing opposition to the military regime.

During the 1970s and 1980s, he collaborated with filmmakers, playwrights, and musicians in further protest works against the dictatorship. Buarque approached the 1983 Concert for Peace in Nicaragua as a valid forum to vocalize his strong political views. Throughout the decade, he crafted many of his songs as vehicles to describe the re-democratization of Brazil. The Concert for Peace in Nicaragua was one in a concert series known as the "Central American Peace Concerts." These concerts featured various Latin American artists. The political turmoil that plagued this era were expressed in many of Buarque's songs. He later wrote Budapeste, a novel that achieved critical national acclaim and won the Prêmio Jabuti, a Brazilian literary award comparable to the Booker Prize.

His 2017 album Caravanas was elected the 3rd best Brazilian album of that year by the Brazilian edition of Rolling Stone.

"Cálice"
Following the Brazilian military coup of 1964, Buarque avoided censorship by using cryptic analogies and wordplay. For example, in the song "Cálice" ("Chalice"), a duet written in 1973 with Gilberto Gil and released with Milton Nascimento in 1978, he takes advantage of the homophony between the Portuguese imperative cale-se ("shut up") and cálice ("chalice") to protest government censorship, disguised as the Gospel narrative of Jesus' Gethsemane prayer to God to relieve him of the cup of suffering. The line "Quero cheirar fumaça de óleo diesel" ("I want to sniff diesel fumes") is a reference to the death of political prisoner Stuart Angel, who reportedly had his mouth glued to a jeep's exhaust pipe during a torture session. Buarque was close to Stuart's mother, Zuzu Angel.  This song is the subject of the final chapter of the book <First Chico Buarque> (Bloomsbury, 2022) in the Brazil 33 1/3 series.

Awards and recognitions
2010 São Paulo Prize for Literature — Shortlisted in the Best Book of the Year category for Leite Derramado
2013 Casa de las Américas prize for Spilt Milk (Leche derramada, Leite derramado), winner of narrative fiction.
2019 Camões Prize.

Discography

1966: Chico Buarque de Hollanda (Vol. 1)
1966: Morte e Vida Severina
1967: Chico Buarque de Hollanda (Vol. 2)
1968: Chico Buarque de Hollanda (Vol. 3)
1969: Umas e outras – compacto
1969: Chico Buarque na Itália
1970: Apesar de você
1970: Per un pugno di samba
1970: Chico Buarque de Hollanda (Vol. 4)
1971: Construção
1972: Quando o carnaval chegar
1972: Caetano e Chico - juntos e ao vivo
1973: Chico canta, mildly edited by the censors of the Brazilian military government both in lyrics and title, it was originally called "Chico Canta Calabar".
1974: Sinal fechado
1975: Chico Buarque & Maria Bethânia ao vivo
1976: Meus caros amigos
1977: Cio da Terra compacto
1977: Os saltimbancos
1977: Gota d'água
1978: Chico Buarque
1979: Ópera do Malandro
1980: Vida
1980: Show 1º de Maio compacto
1981: Almanaque
1981: Saltimbancos trapalhões
1982: Chico Buarque en espanhol
1983: Para viver um grande amor
1983: O grande circo místico
1984: Chico Buarque (Vermelho)
1985: O Corsário do rei
1985: Ópera do Malandro
1985: Malandro
1986: Melhores momentos de Chico & Caetano
1987: Francisco
1988: Dança da meia-lua
1989: Chico Buarque
1990: Chico Buarque ao vivo Paris le Zenith
1993: Para Todos
1995: Uma palavra
1997: Terra
1998: As cidades
1998: Chico Buarque da Mangueira
1999: Chico ao vivo
2001: Chico e as cidades (DVD)
2001: Cambaio
2002: Chico Buarque – Duetos
2003: Chico ou o país da delicadeza perdida (DVD)
2005: Meu Caro Amigo (DVD)
2005: A Flor da Pele (DVD)
2005: Vai passar (DVD)
2005: Anos Dourados (DVD)
2005: Estação Derradeira (DVD)
2005: Bastidores (DVD)
2006: O Futebol (DVD)
2006: Romance (DVD)
2006: Uma Palavra (DVD)
2006: Carioca (CD + DVD with the documentary Desconstrução)
2007: Carioca Ao Vivo
2011: Chico Buarque
2012: Na Carreira (DVD)
2017: Caravanas
2018: "Caravanas - Ao vivo"

Other works

Books 1966: A Banda (Songbook)
 1974: Fazenda Modelo
 1979: Chapeuzinho Amarelo
 1981: A Bordo do Rui Barbosa
 1991: Estorvo
 1995: Benjamin
 2003: Budapeste
 2009: Leite Derramado
 2014: O Irmão Alemão
 2019: Essa Gente
 2021: Anos de Chumbo

Plays 1967/8: Roda Viva
 1973: Calabar (coauthored with Ruy Guerra)
 1975: Gota d'água
 1978: Ópera do Malandro (based on John Gay's Beggar's Opera and Bertolt Brecht's Threepenny Opera)
 1983: O Grande Circo Místico

Film 1972: Quando o carnaval chegar (coauthor)
 1983: Para viver um grande amor (coauthor)
 1985: Ópera do Malandro
 2009: Budapeste (based on his book)

In popular culture 
The cover art of the Buarque's 1966 album Chico Buarque de Hollanda became a viral internet meme with "happy" Chico and "sad" Chico.

Notes

References

External links

  
 
 
 
 
 
 
 annotated Chico Buarque discography on Slipcue.com

1944 births
Living people
Latin Grammy Award winners
Bossa nova singers
Bossa nova guitarists
Samba musicians
Música Popular Brasileira singers
Brazilian male guitarists
21st-century Brazilian male singers
21st-century Brazilian singers
Brazilian male poets
Brazilian socialists
Musicians from Rio de Janeiro (city)
Wrasse Records artists
20th-century Brazilian novelists
Brazilian male novelists
Brazilian expatriates in Italy
Spanish-language singers of Brazil
Latin music composers
Latin music songwriters
20th-century Brazilian musicians
21st-century Brazilian musicians
20th-century composers
21st-century composers
20th-century guitarists
21st-century guitarists
20th-century Brazilian male singers
20th-century Brazilian singers
Male jazz musicians
21st-century Brazilian novelists
20th-century Brazilian male writers
21st-century Brazilian male writers
20th-century Brazilian poets
21st-century Brazilian poets
Brazilian male singer-songwriters
Camões Prize winners